HARM or H.A.R.M. may refer to:
 AGM-88 HARM, a high-speed anti-radiation missile
 Historic Aircraft Restoration Museum, a museum in Creve Coeur, Missouri, United States
 A fictional terrorist organisation in the video games The Operative: No One Lives Forever and No One Lives Forever 2: A Spy in H.A.R.M.'s Way
 Human Aetiological Relations Machine, an organisation in the 1966 film Agent for H.A.R.M.
 Hoosier Anti-Racist Movement, an Antifa cell based in Indiana associated with Anti-Racist Action (aka Torch Network)

Harm may refer to:
 Harm, a moral and legal concept
 Harm principle, a law principle
 Penal harm, a theory that inmates in prison should suffer additional pain to deprivation of liberty  
 Physical injury or trauma (medicine)
 Harm (given name), a Dutch masculine given name
 Harmon "Harm" Rabb, a character in the TV series JAG
 Ray Harm (born 1920s), an American artist
 Harm's Way (novel), a 1962 war novel by James Bassett
 In Harm's Way, a 1965 film based on the novel
 "Harm's Way" (Angel), a 2004 episode of the television series Angel
 In Harm's Way (TV series), a 2008 reality television series
 "In Harm's Way", a 2004 episode of the fan-created internet series Star Trek: New Voyages

See also
 Harms, a surname
 Do No Harm (disambiguation)
 Safe from Harm (disambiguation)